Orešany is a municipality in the Topoľčany District, Nitra Region, Slovakia.

Orešany may also refer to:

Dolné Orešany, a village and municipality of Trnava District, Trnava region, Slovakia
Horné Orešany, a village and municipality of Trnava District, Trnava region, Slovakia

See also
Orzeszyn, a village in east-central Poland
Orechová (disambiguation)